Pyroderces firma is a moth in the family Cosmopterigidae. It is found on the Seychelles and possibly the Democratic Republic of Congo.

References

Natural History Museum Lepidoptera generic names catalog

firma
Moths described in 1911